Cockey Down is a 15.2 hectare biological Site of Special Scientific Interest in Wiltshire, notified in 1971.

The site is managed as a nature reserve by Wiltshire Wildlife Trust.

Sources

 Natural England citation sheet for the site (accessed 24 March 2022)

External links
 Cockey Down - Wiltshire Wildlife Trust
 Natural England website (SSSI information)

Sites of Special Scientific Interest in Wiltshire
Sites of Special Scientific Interest notified in 1971
Wiltshire Wildlife Trust reserves